Heinz "Negus" Marquardt (29 December 1922 – 19 December 2003) was a German Luftwaffe fighter ace and recipient of the Knight's Cross of the Iron Cross, the highest award in the military and paramilitary forces of Nazi Germany during World War II. Marquardt was credited with 121 aerial victories—that is, 121 aerial combat encounters resulting in the destruction of the enemy aircraft—with a further 16 unconfirmed victories in 320 combat missions. All but one of his victories were claimed over the Eastern Front.

World War II
Marquardt was born on 29 December 1922 in Braunsberg, present-day Braniewo in Poland, at the time in East Prussia a province of the Weimar Republic's Free State of Prussia. On 15 September 1941, he was posted to the Jagdfliegerschule 5 (JFS 5—5th fighter pilot school), stationed at the Le Havre – Octeville airfield in France. As of 1 February 1942, he served as a fighter pilot instructor and flew a number of operational sorties on the Channel Front with the operational squadron of JFS 5.

Eastern Front
On 1 August 1943, Marquard was transferred to the 11. Staffel (11th squadron) of Jagdgeschwader 51 "Mölders" (JG 51—51st Fighter Wing) operating on the Eastern Front. His transfer to JG 51 occurred during the Soviet Belgorod-Kharkov Offensive Operation where it supported the 8th Army. The Staffel was commanded by Hauptmann Adolf Borchers and subordinated to IV. Gruppe of JG 51 headed by Major Hans-Ekkehard Bob. According to Obermaier, Marquardt claimed his first aerial victory on 2 October, shooting down an Ilyushin Il-2 ground attack aircraft.

On 22 June 1944, Soviet forces launched Operation Bagration, the strategic offensive operation against Army Group Centre. In consequence, IV. On 14 August, Marquardt claimed a Yakovlev Yak-9 fighter near Osowiec Fortress. Later that day, IV. Gruppe retreated to an airfield at Tilsit, present-day Sovetsk located on the south bank of the Neman River. The next day, as part of the group expansion from three Staffeln per Gruppe to four Staffeln per Gruppe, 10. Staffel was re-designated and became the 13. Staffel while 11. Staffel became the 14. Staffel of JG 51. Marquardt was then transferred and served with 13. Staffel which was commanded by Leutnant Peter Kalden. On 28 August, IV. Here, the Gruppe predominately flew combat missions to the area north and northeast of Warsaw. The next day, Marquardt claimed a Yak-9 fighter shot down northeast of Warsaw. On 10 September, Marquardt was awarded German Cross in Gold.

Marquard and his Gruppenkommandeur (group commander), Hauptmann Heinz Lange, both received the Knight's Cross of the Iron Cross on 18 November for 89 and 70 aerial victories respectively. On 14 April 1945, Marquardt was credited with his 100th aerial victory. He was the 102nd Luftwaffe pilot to achieve the century mark. On a transfer flight of new Focke-Wulf Fw 190 D-9 to his unit, he was credited with four aerial victories over Yakovlev Yak-3 on 25 April 1945. On 30 April, Marquardt accidentally ran his Fw 190 D-9 into a drainage ditch on a transfer flight. Due to lack of spare parts, the damage was not reparable and the aircraft was blown up to prevent it from falling to the enemy.

On 1 May 1945 Marquardt became Jagdgeschwader 51s last casualty of the war when he was shot down by Royal Air Force Spitfires north of Berlin. Marquardt had led a flight of six Focke-Wulf Fw 190 D-9 on an escort mission of 12 Fw 190 F-8 ground attack aircraft from Redlin on a mission to Berlin. After completing the mission the aircraft returned to Schwerin. During the landing approach the flight came under attack of 6 Spitfire Mk XIV from No. 41 Squadron. Marquardt ordered his flight to cover the landing of the ground attack fighters while he and his wingman, Feldwebel Radlauer, attacked the Spitfires from below. Marquardt claimed one of the attackers but was shot down as well along with two other Fw 190s. Radlauer saw Marquardt's Fw 190 crash in flames but did not observe any sign of life. Marquardt was initially reported as killed in action but he had bailed out injured and was taken to a hospital in Schwerin, where he was taken prisoner of war shortly after.

Later life
Following World War II, Marquardt served in the newly established German Air Force of West Germany with the rank of Leutnant (Second Lieutenant) on 16 August 1956. He served with Jagdgeschwader 73 (JG 73—73rd Fighter Wing) and Leichtes Kampfgeschwader 42 (LeKG 42—42nd Light Combat Wing). Marquardt retired on 30 September 1973, having risen to the rank of Oberstleutnant (Lieutenant Colonel). He died on 19 December 2003.

Summary of career

Aerial victory claims
According to US historian David T. Zabecki, Marquardt was credited with 121 aerial victories. His aerial victories were claimed on 320 combat missions. Mathews and Foreman, authors of Luftwaffe Aces — Biographies and Victory Claims, researched the German Federal Archives and state that Marquardt was credited with more than 121 aerial victories, all of which claimed on the Eastern Front.

Victory claims were logged to a map-reference (PQ = Planquadrat), for example "PQ 34 Ost 39551". These sectors were then subdivided into 36 smaller units to give a location area 3 × 4 km in size.

Awards
 Iron Cross (1939) 2nd and 1st Class
 Honor Goblet of the Luftwaffe (26 July 1944)
 German Cross in Gold on 10 September 1944 as Oberfeldwebel in the 10./Jagdgeschwader 51
 Knight's Cross of the Iron Cross on 18 November 1944 as Fahnenjunker-Oberfeldwebel and pilot in the 13./Jagdgeschwader 51 "Mölders"

Notes

References

Citations

Bibliography

 
 
 
 
 
 
 
 
 
 
 
 
 
 

Recipients of the Gold German Cross
Recipients of the Knight's Cross of the Iron Cross
Luftwaffe pilots
German World War II flying aces
German Air Force pilots
1922 births
2003 deaths
People from East Prussia
People from Braniewo